Pterostylis mystacina is a plant in the orchid family Orchidaceae and is endemic to Queensland. It was first formally described in 2010 by David Jones and given the name Oligochaetochilus mystacinus. The description was published in the journal The Orchadian from a specimen found on Mount Moffat near the Carnarvon National Park. In the same year, Jasmine Janes and Marco Duretto changed the name to Pterostylis mystacina. The specific epithet (mystacina) is derived from the Ancient Greek word mystax meaning "hair on the upper lip".

References

mystacina
Orchids of New South Wales
Taxa named by Marco Duretto
Plants described in 2010
Taxa named by David L. Jones (botanist)